Kulabad ( or ) may refer to:
 Kulabad, Lorestan
 Kulabad, Razavi Khorasan
 Kulabad, West Azerbaijan